Menschenwee  is a 1921 Dutch silent film directed by Theo Frenkel, based on the 1903 novel of the same name by Israël Querido.

Cast
 Willem van der Veer - Kapitein Beets
 Coen Hissink - Balthazar de Tijger
 Kitty Kluppell - Eva, Beets' dochter
 Louis Davids - Willy Vermeer
 Jan Lemaire Jr. - Zwervertje
 Vera van Haeften - Caroline, Beets' oudere dochter

External links 
 

1921 films
Dutch silent feature films
Dutch black-and-white films
Films directed by Theo Frenkel